Ronald Lee "Ron" Hunter (June 14, 1943 – December 3, 2013) was an American actor, whose career spanned nearly five decades in television, film and theater.

Hunter was born in Boston, Massachusetts, and raised in the suburb of Brookline. Most of his credits were television appearances. Until 1979, he performed roles in mostly New York City stage productions, like Lord Hastings in the Broadway production of Richard III. He previously appeared in One Life to Live, the PBS docudrama The Edelin Conversation as Dr. Kenneth Edelin, and Kojak as "a perennial undergraduate". His first major television appearance was The Lazarus Syndrome, co-starring Louis Gossett Jr. He portrayed a minor role in the 1979 film The Seduction of Joe Tynan, starring Alan Alda. He also co-starred in the 1980s PBS miniseries, Three Sovereigns for Sarah, and the pilot film of the CBS series Cagney and Lacey as Harvey Lacey. He portrayed one of the case suspects in the 1988 made-for-television film Internal Affairs, starring Richard Crenna. He also appeared in Along Came Polly (2004), Law & Order (1991) and The Big Bang Theory (2008).

Hunter died of heart and kidney failure on December 3, 2013, aged 70, at the Woodland Hills Medical Center in Los Angeles, California. He was survived by his three children, two grandchildren and sister.

References

External links

1943 births
2013 deaths
American male television actors
American male film actors
American male stage actors
20th-century American male actors
21st-century American male actors
Male actors from Massachusetts
New York University alumni
University of Pennsylvania alumni
Male actors from Boston
Deaths from multiple organ failure